"Hard to Explain" is a song by American rock band the Strokes. It was released as the lead single from their debut studio album, Is This It (2001), June 25, 2001. It peaked at number 10 in Ireland and number 16 in the United Kingdom.

Reception
The single was voted number 3 on the NME Top 100 songs of the decade. In October 2011, NME placed it at number 36 on its list "150 Best Tracks of the Past 15 Years". Rolling Stone placed the song at number 59 on its list "100 Best Songs of the 2000s." In 2020, The Independent and Paste ranked the song number two and number one, respectively, on their lists of the 20 greatest Strokes songs.

Music video
The music video for this song largely consists of a montage of random stock footage interspersed with images of the band members performing. It was directed by the team of Roman Coppola and Johannes Gamble (as well as an uncredited Julian Casablancas).  Footage of The Strokes playing "Take It or Leave It" from MTV2's "Two Dollar Bill" concert is used in the video. Amongst stock footage, the video contains clips from Magnum, P.I. and Knight Rider (both of which are credited), a clip from the film Brainstorm, a commercial for the 1970 Dodge Charger 500 (scene of a woman sitting in a car), a clip from the film WarGames, a less-than-2-second fragment from Emmanuelle , NASA footage of the Space Shuttle Atlantis in orbit, gameplay of the 1981 Sega arcade game Turbo, the rocket engine firing of the Saturn V and an image of particle tracks in a bubble chamber (which forms the American album cover for Is This It). Some of the stock footage was taken from the film Koyaanisqatsi, directed by Godfrey Reggio, which was presented by Francis Ford Coppola.

Track listing

Personnel 

The Strokes
Julian Casablancas – vocals
Nick Valensi – rhythm guitar (1), lead guitar (2)
Albert Hammond Jr. – lead guitar (1), rhythm guitar (2)
Nikolai Fraiture – bass guitar
Fabrizio Moretti – drums

Additional personnel
Gordon Raphael – production
Greg Calbi – mastering

Charts

References

External links

2001 debut singles
The Strokes songs
Songs written by Julian Casablancas
2001 songs
Music videos directed by Roman Coppola
RCA Records singles
Rough Trade Records singles